Leland Crooke is an American actor from stage and film. He is known from several stage plays and films by David Beaird.

Career
In February 1980, Crooke gave his stage debut in the play Bal (Richard Nelson's loose adaptation of Bertolt Brecht's play Baal with James Belushi in title role) which was staged at the Goodman Theatre in Chicago. In October of the same year he was cast as Swiss Cheese, the youngest son of Mother Courage in Sharon Ott's adaption of Brecht's play Mother Courage and Her Children at the Milwaukee Repertory Theater in Milwaukee, Wisconsin. In 1981 he was seen as Lackey (a musketeer) in Cyrano de Bergerac at the same theatre. In 1984, he met director, screenwriter, and playwright David Beaird with whom he collaborated at the films The Party Animal (1984), My Chauffeur (1986), It Takes Two, Pass the Ammo (both 1988), Scorchers (1991), and The Civilization of Maxwell Bright (2005). Crooke was also seen in Beaird's stage plays Scorchers (1985 in the role of Jumper at the Equity Waiver Theater in Los Angeles) and 900 Oneonta (1999 in the role of Dandy at the Odyssey Theatre in Los Angeles). In addition Crooke played guest roles in television series including Key West (created by Beaird), Matlock, Melrose Place, ER, Star Trek: Deep Space Nine, Buffy the Vampire Slayer, JAG, Angel, and Charmed.

References

External links
 
 

Living people
American male film actors
American male stage actors
American male television actors
Place of birth missing (living people)
Year of birth missing (living people)